Peterborough—Kawartha is a federal electoral district in Ontario, Canada, that has been represented in the House of Commons of Canada since 1953. Prior to the 2015 election, the riding was known as Peterborough.

Geography
It now consists of the City of Peterborough and the municipalities of: Douro-Dummer, Trent Lakes, Havelock-Belmont-Methuen, North Kawartha and Selwyn plus the Curve Lake First Nation.

History
The riding's borders have differed slightly since its creation in 1953, but has always included most or all of Peterborough County and its county seat of Peterborough, Ontario. Prior to 1952, Peterborough was split into two ridings, one of which was sometimes partly joined to neighbouring Hastings County. Since 1999, the riding boundaries and names of the provincial and federal electoral districts have been identical.

It was created in 1953 from Peterborough West and Hastings—Peterborough. It consisted initially of the city of Peterborough and the townships of Galway, Cavendish, Harvey, Ennismore, Smith, Douro, Otonabee, and North Monaghan. In 1966, the townships of Galway, Cavendish and Harvey were removed from the riding, and the townships of Belmont and Methuen, Dummer, Smith and Asphodel (excluding the Village of Hastings) were added.

In 1976, it was redefined to consist of the part of the County of Peterborough lying south of the Townships of Burleigh and Anstruther, Chandos and Harvey, but excluding the Township of Cavan and the Village of Hastings. In 1987, the Village of Millbrook was excluded, and the Village of Hastings was added to the riding.

In 2003, the Township of North Monaghan was removed from the riding.

In 2013, the riding lost the Townships of Otonabee-South Monaghan, Asphodel-Norwood, and the Hiawatha First Nation, while subsequently gaining the townships of Trent Lakes and North Kawartha.

The riding is a noted bellwether; it has been won by a member of the governing party of the day in all but four general elections since its creation. It has voted not to elect candidates whose party formed government in 1953, 1963, 1980, and 2021. Former MP Dean Del Mastro, who was elected as a member of the Conservative Party of Canada, resigned from the Conservative caucus in 2013. In 2014, Del Mastro was found guilty of falsifying his expense report in the 2008 election, failing to include $21,000 in expenses and spending more than the election spending limit. He resigned his seat on November 5, 2014.

Members of Parliament
This riding has elected the following Members of Parliament:

Election results

Peterborough—Kawartha

Peterborough
	

	
Note: Conservative vote is compared to the total of the Canadian Alliance vote and Progressive Conservative vote in 2000 election.
					

Note: Canadian Alliance vote is compared to the Reform vote in 1997 election.

	

	

					

	

Note: New Party vote is compared to CCF vote in 1958 election.

See also
 List of Canadian federal electoral districts
 Past Canadian electoral districts

References

House of Commons of Canada historical ridings section
 2011 results from Elections Canada
 Campaign expense data from Elections Canada

Notes

Ontario federal electoral districts
Politics of Peterborough, Ontario